General Cooke may refer to:

George Cooke (British Army officer) (1766–1837), British Army major general
Henry Frederick Cooke (c. 1783–1837), British Army major general
John Rogers Cooke (1833–1891), Confederate States Army brigadier general
Philip St. George Cooke (1809–1895), Union Army brigadier general and brevet major general
Ronald Cooke (British Army officer) (1899–1971), British Army major general
Thomas Cooke (British Army officer) (1841–1912), British Army general

See also
James Cooke-Collis (1876–1941), British Army major general
General Cook (disambiguation)